Levan Kenia (born 18 October 1990) is a Georgian professional footballer who plays as an attacking midfielder for German club KFC Uerdingen.

Club career
Kenia joined Schalke 04 from Lokomotivi Tbilisi in January 2008, signing a contract with the club that ran until June 2012 Kenia made his debut for Schalke 04 against APOEL F.C. in a UEFA Cup match on 2 October 2008 coming on as a 65th-minute substitute for Gerald Asamoah. Formerly, Kenia trained for two weeks at the age of 14 with FC Barcelona.

On 11 April 2009, Kenia made his Bundesliga debut for Schalke in a match against Karlsruher SC.

On 14 August 2012, Kenia joined Ukrainian Premier League side FC Karpaty Lviv on a two-year contract. After spending one year in Ukraine, Kenia returned to Germany and signed a contract with Fortuna Düsseldorf for two years.

At Düsseldorf however he could never fulfill the expectations. Signed as the playmaker, he played only eleven games during the 2013–14 season. In the second half of the campaign he even earned just a single cap playing four minutes. On 1 July 2014, according to previous rumors, it was announced that his contract was dissolved.

In the summer of 2018, he joined a Luxembourgian club Dudelange.

In 2021 he joined German Regionalliga club KFC Uerdingen as playing assistant.

International career
Kenia made his debut for the national team on 8 September 2007 against Ukraine, replacing Alexander Iashvili. Georgia's former head coach Klaus Toppmöller said he had never before seen a player of his age with such accomplished technical abilities. Kenia, along with fellow teenagers Levan Mchedlidze and Giorgi Makaridze, played in their UEFA Euro 2008 qualifying campaign starring in a 2–0 victory over Scotland. Toppmöller praised Kenia, "Kenia was one of the best on the pitch."

He scored his first international goal on 27 May 2008 against Estonia.

Personal life
Levan is also the nephew of former SC Freiburg midfielder Georgi Kiknadze.

Career statistics

Club

International

Scores and results list Georgia's goal tally first, score column indicates score after each Kenia goal.

References

External links
 
 
 

1990 births
Footballers from Tbilisi
Living people
Footballers from Georgia (country)
Association football midfielders
Georgia (country) international footballers
Georgia (country) under-21 international footballers
FC Lokomotivi Tbilisi players
FC Schalke 04 players
FC Schalke 04 II players
FC Karpaty Lviv players
Fortuna Düsseldorf players
SK Slavia Prague players
F91 Dudelange players
FC Saburtalo Tbilisi players
KFC Uerdingen 05 players
Erovnuli Liga players
Bundesliga players
2. Bundesliga players
Ukrainian Premier League players
Czech First League players
Luxembourg National Division players
Regionalliga players
Oberliga (football) players
Expatriate footballers from Georgia (country)
Expatriate sportspeople from Georgia (country) in Germany
Expatriate footballers in Germany
Expatriate sportspeople from Georgia (country) in Ukraine
Expatriate footballers in Ukraine
Expatriate sportspeople from Georgia (country) in the Czech Republic
Expatriate footballers in the Czech Republic
Expatriate sportspeople from Georgia (country) in Luxembourg
Expatriate footballers in Luxembourg